Pisgah is a town in Jackson County, Alabama, United States, and is included in the Huntsville-Decatur Combined Statistical Area. It incorporated in 1947. As of the 2020 census, the population of the town was 681, down from 722 in 2010. Pisgah is located atop Sand Mountain.

History

Pisgah was first settled in the late 1830s.  A post office was established in 1878.

Geography
Pisgah is located at  (34.685022, -85.846575). The town is situated just off State Route 71, northeast of Section and northwest of Henagar.  It lies along the western edge of Sand Mountain, with the Tennessee River (Guntersville Lake) below.

Demographics

As of the census of 2000, there were 706 people, 294 households, and 206 families residing in the town. The racial makeup of the town was 94.33% White, 0.14% Black or African American, 3.40% Native American, and 2.12% from two or more races. 0.28% of the population were Hispanic or Latino of any race.

There were 294 households, out of which 32.0% had children under the age of 18 living with them, 54.8% were married couples living together, 12.2% had a female householder with no husband present, and 29.6% were non-families. 28.9% of all households were made up of individuals, and 15.0% had someone living alone who was 65 years of age or older. The average household size was 2.40 and the average family size was 2.95.

In the town, the population was spread out, with 25.4% under the age of 18, 9.3% from 18 to 24, 28.9% from 25 to 44, 20.4% from 45 to 64, and 16.0% who were 65 years of age or older. The median age was 36 years. For every 100 females, there were 87.3 males. For every 100 females age 18 and over, there were 82.4 males.

The median income for a household in the town was $28,750, and the median income for a family was $36,250. Males had a median income of $26,146 versus $17,917 for females. The per capita income for the town was $14,503. About 9.5% of families and 10.4% of the population were below the poverty line, including 14.2% of those under age 18 and 15.0% of those age 65 or over.

Pisgah High School
Pisgah High School is a kindergarten through twelfth grade school and is part of the Jackson County school system. Enrollment is around 570 students.

References

External links

Towns in Jackson County, Alabama
Towns in Alabama
Huntsville-Decatur, AL Combined Statistical Area